Euploea doubledayi, the greater striped black crow, is a butterfly found in India and South-East Asia that belongs to the crows and tigers, that is, the danaid group of the brush-footed butterflies family.

See also
List of butterflies of India
List of butterflies of India (Nymphalidae)

References
 

Euploea
Butterflies of Asia
Butterflies of Indochina
Butterflies described in 1865
Taxa named by Baron Cajetan von Felder
Taxa named by Rudolf Felder